"Yard of Blonde Girls" is a song written by sisters Audrey Clark of the Boston band the 360s and Lori Kramer of the Paper Squares, who were performing together in the late nineties as Pendulum Floors. Inger Lorre contributed additional lyrics on the second verse, which were written about singer-songwriter Jeff Buckley. Lorre had a relationship with Buckley, but never told him that the verse was about him. Buckley and Lorre recorded a demo version of the song in 1996. The song is a tribute to Lori Kramer's childhood friend, who committed suicide in 1993.

It is most notably found as a cover on Jeff Buckley's posthumous double album Sketches for My Sweetheart the Drunk (1998). It was also released on Lorre's album Transcendental Medication (1999) and recorded by Micah P. Hinson on the tribute album Dream Brother: The Songs of Tim and Jeff Buckley (2006).

The song has also been covered by Alpha Rev, Widespread Panic, Déportivo and Incubus in their live performances.

References

1998 songs
Jeff Buckley songs